José Ángel Carrillo Casamayor (born 7 January 1994) is a Spanish footballer who plays for SD Huesca. Mainly a forward, he can also play as a right winger.

Career

Murcia
Born in Murcia, Carrillo finished his graduation with local Real Murcia's youth system, and made his senior debuts with the reserves in the 2013–14 season in Tercera División.

On 26 January 2014 Carrillo made his official debut for the Murcians' first-team, playing the last five minutes of a 2–2 home draw against RCD Mallorca in the Segunda División. In June, after the club's administrative relegation, he was definitely promoted to the main squad.

Sevilla Atlético / Cádiz
On 17 July 2015, Carrillo was transferred to fellow Segunda División B club Sevilla Atlético. He contributed with 37 appearances and four goals during the campaign, as his side achieved promotion to the second level.

Carrillo scored his first professional goal on 2 September 2016, netting the equalizer in a 1–1 home draw against UCAM Murcia CF. On 1 September of the following year, he signed a three-year deal with Cádiz CF, still in the second division.

Córdoba / Hapoel Be'er Sheva
On 27 January 2019, after featuring sparingly during the campaign, Carrillo agreed to a two-and-a-half-year contract with Córdoba CF in the same division. On 11 June, after suffering relegation, he terminated his contract and moved to Hapoel Be'er Sheva FC in the following day.

Lugo
Carrillo left Hapoel with just one match, and on 22 November 2019, he signed a short-term deal back at Spain's second division with CD Lugo.

Huesca
On 22 August 2022, free agent Carrillo signed a two-year contract with SD Huesca also in the second level.

International career
Carrillo is eligible to represent Spain at international level. He is as well eligible to play for the Philippines due to his great grandfather being born in the country.

In 2019, it was reported that Carrillo received an invitation to train with the Philippines.

References

External links

1994 births
Living people
Spanish people of Filipino descent
Footballers from Murcia
Spanish footballers
Association football forwards
Segunda División players
Segunda División B players
Tercera División players
Real Murcia players
Sevilla Atlético players
Cádiz CF players
Córdoba CF players
CD Lugo players
SD Huesca footballers
Hapoel Be'er Sheva F.C. players
Spanish expatriate footballers
Spanish expatriate sportspeople in Israel
Expatriate footballers in Israel